Matthew Mitchell Jr. (born March 18, 1999) is an American professional basketball player for SIG Strasbourg of the French LNB Pro A. He played college basketball for the San Diego State Aztecs.

High school career
As a freshman, Mitchell helped Martin Luther King High School in Riverside, California win the CIF Southern Section Division 1A championship. After the season, he transferred to Eleanor Roosevelt High School in Eastvale, California. As a senior, Mitchell averaged 25.4 points, 9.5 rebounds, three assists and 2.2 steals per game, recording 16 double-doubles and scoring least 30 points in 10 games. He led Roosevelt to CIF State Division I, CIF Southern California Regional and Big VIII League titles. Mitchell was named HSGametime Player of the Year by The Press-Enterprise. He had success with Dream Vision on the Amateur Athletic Union circuit. Mitchell initially committed and signed a National Letter of Intent to play college basketball for Cal State Fullerton. After his senior season, he reopened his recruitment and committed to San Diego State. Mitchell was considered a three-star recruit by most recruiting services.

College career
On November 20, 2017, in his fourth collegiate game, Mitchell scored a career-high 31 points, 26 of which came in the second half, in a 94–63 win over Eastern Illinois. He shot 7-of-11 from three-point range and scored the most points for a San Diego State freshman since Evan Burns in 2003. As a freshman, Mitchell averaged 10.5 points and four rebounds per game. On December 22, 2018, he scored a sophomore season-high 22 points, shooting 9-of-12 from the field, in a 90–81 victory over BYU. As a sophomore, Mitchell averaged 10.3 points and 4.1 rebounds per game. During the season, he gained about 20 pounds. In the offseason, he cut down his weight by improving his diet and spending more time in the gym. On February 1, 2020, Mitchell scored a junior season-high 28 points, including 24 in the second half, in an 80–68 win over Utah State. As a junior, he averaged 12.2 points and 4.8 rebounds per game, helping San Diego State achieve a 30–2 record. Mitchell earned first-team and second-team All-Mountain West honors in the coaches and media polls, respectively. On April 26, he declared for the 2020 NBA draft while maintaining his college eligibility. Mitchell announced he was withdrawing from the draft on August 1. On December 18, he scored a career-high 35 points in a 72–62 loss to BYU.

At the close of his senior season, Mitchell was named Mountain West Player of the Year. He averaged 15.4 points, 5.6 rebounds and 2.0 assists per game. Mitchell declared for the 2021 NBA draft and hired an agent.

Professional career
After going undrafted in the 2021 NBA draft, Mitchell signed with the San Antonio Spurs for Summer League. On August 2, 2021, Mitchell signed with SIG Strasbourg of the LNB Pro A.

Career statistics

College

|-
| style="text-align:left;"| 2017–18
| style="text-align:left;"| San Diego State
| 33 || 32 || 26.5 || .450 || .358 || .765 || 4.0 || 1.7 || 1.1 || .2 || 10.5
|-
| style="text-align:left;"| 2018–19
| style="text-align:left;"| San Diego State
| 34 || 33 || 26.4 || .405 || .328 || .755 || 4.1 || 1.8 || .7 || .2 || 10.3
|-
| style="text-align:left;"| 2019–20
| style="text-align:left;"| San Diego State
| 32 || 19 || 25.8 || .468 || .393 || .873 || 4.8 || 1.7 || 1.1 || .3 || 12.2
|-
| style="text-align:left;"| 2020–21
| style="text-align:left;"| San Diego State
| 25 || 24 || 29.8 || .436 || .337 || .809 || 5.6 || 2.0 || 1.4 || .2 || 15.4
|- class="sortbottom"
| style="text-align:center;" colspan="2"| Career
| 124 || 108 || 27.0 || .439 || .354 || .804 || 4.5 || 1.8 || 1.0 || .3 || 11.9

References

External links
San Diego State Aztecs bio

1999 births
Living people
American men's basketball players
Basketball players from Riverside, California
San Diego State Aztecs men's basketball players
SIG Basket players
Small forwards